Jon Aberasturi Izaga (born 28 March 1989) is a Spanish cyclist, who currently rides for UCI WorldTeam . In August 2018, he was named in the startlist for the Vuelta a España.

Major results

2011
 3rd Overall Grand Prix du Portugal
1st Stage 1
2012
 4th Overall Volta ao Alentejo
 8th Trofeo Migjorn
2013
 8th Paris–Tours
2014
 5th Overall Tour de Gironde
1st Stage 1 (TTT)
 6th Trofeo Palma
 10th Vuelta a La Rioja
2016
 1st  Points classification, Tour de Kumano
 1st Stage 1 Tour de Korea
 1st Stage 1 Tour de Hokkaido
2017
 Tour of Thailand
1st  Points classification
1st Stage 3
 Tour of Qinghai Lake
1st Stages 1 & 5
 Tour de Korea
1st Stages 1 & 4
 1st Stage 4 Tour of Japan
 1st Stage 1 Tour of Hainan
2018
 1st Stage 1 Vuelta a Aragón
 3rd Circuito de Getxo
 6th Paris–Bourges
 10th Clásica de Almería
2019
 1st Circuito de Getxo
 Boucles de la Mayenne
1st  Points classification
1st Stage 2
 1st Stage 2 Vuelta a Burgos
 10th Gran Premio Bruno Beghelli
2020
 1st Stage 1 Tour de Hongrie
 3rd Trofeo Campos, Porreres, Felanitx, Ses Salines
 4th Circuito de Getxo
2021
 1st Stage 3 Tour of Slovenia
 2nd Cholet-Pays de la Loire
 4th Clásica de Almería
 4th Per sempre Alfredo
2022
 8th Kampioenschap van Vlaanderen
 9th Road race, UEC European Road Championships
2023
 9th Milano–Torino

Grand Tour general classification results timeline

References

External links

1989 births
Living people
Cyclists from the Basque Country (autonomous community)
Sportspeople from Vitoria-Gasteiz
Spanish male cyclists
21st-century Spanish people